The Italian ambassador to Pakistan is the ambassador of the Italian Government to the Government of Pakistan. 

Since 1948 Italy and Pakistan maintain diplomatic relations.

List of representatives 
<onlyinclude>

References 

Pakistan
Italy